Dennis Heaton is a Canadian screenwriter working in film and television. He formerly executive produced and show-ran The Order for Netflix. Other recent credits include executive producing and writing on Ghost Wars for SYFY and Netflix, executive producing and showrunning Motive on CTV/NBCU, Call Me Fitz (HBO Canada/Audience Network), The Listener (CTV/NBC), JPOD (CBC), Blood Ties (Lifetime/Space) and the feature film Fido.

Heaton received two 2014 Canadian Screen Awards Nominations for Best Dramatic Series for Motive and Best Comedy Series for Call Me Fitz, with Fitz winning the category.
He has four prior Gemini Award
nominations, four Canadian Screenwriting Award nominations, winning for his Yvon of the Yukon script "The Trouble With Mammoths", and eleven Leo Award nominations, winning for his Being Ian script "The Greatest Story Never Told" and his Call Me Fitz script "Fucking Memories". His web series, My Pal Satan, won Best Web Series and Theme Song at the New York Television Festival. His short film Head Shot premiered in competition at the Berlin International Film Festival, won best short film at the Just For Laughs Festival in Montreal, and went on to play in film festivals and on television around the world.

He won two Leo Awards in 2015 - one for Best Dramatic Series for Motive and one for
Best Screenwriting/ Animation Program or Series for Nerds and Monsters - "Are You Gonna Eat That?"

Dennis Heaton has served as the Pacific Region Councilor for the Writers Guild of Canada since 2012. In 2018, he was elected president of the WGC.

Filmography

Film

Television
The numbers in directing and writing credits refer to the number of episodes.

Awards and nominations
Awards
 2015 Leo - Best Dramatic Series for Motive
 2015 Leo - Best Screenwriting for an Animation Program or Series for Nerds And Monsters - Episode "Are You Gonna Eat That?"
 2012 Leo - Best Screenwriting in a Music, Comedy, or Variety Program or Series - Call Me Fitz: "Fucking Memories"
 2009 Best Web Series and Theme Song, New York Television Festival for My Pal Satan
 2005 Leo - Best Animation Program or Series - Being Ian
 2003 Writers Guild of Canada - Top 10 - Yvon of the Yukon
Nominations
 2015 Leo - Best Dramatic Series for Motive
 2014 Leo - Best Dramatic Series for Motive
 2012 Leo - Best Screenwriting in a Music, Comedy, or Variety Program or Series - Call Me Fitz: "Dysfunctional Family Circus"
 2010 Leo - Best Web Series - My Pal Satan
 2009 Writers Guild of Canada - Best Short Subject or Web Series - My Pal Satan
 2008 Leo - Best Screenwriting in an Animation Program or Series - George of the Jungle
 2008 Leo - Best Screenwriting in a Dramatic Series - jPod: "Betty & Veronica Syndrome"
 2007 Leo - Best Screenwriting in a Feature Length Drama - Fido
 2007 Leo - Best Screenwriting in a Short Drama - Head Shot
 2007 Leo - Best Short Drama - Head Shot
 2007 Writers Guild of Canada Award - Feature Film Fido
 2006 Berlin Film Festival Best Short Film - Head Shot
 2005 Leo - Best Animation Program or Series - Being Ian
 2004 Writers Guild of Canada Award - Best Writing in Children's & Preschool - Yvon of the Yukon episode "Siamese Twits"
 2002 Leo - Best Screenwriting Youth Or Children's Program Or Series - Yvon of the Yukon - "An ‘F’ In Friendship"

References

External links
 
 An Interview with Dennis Heaton
 The Dennis Heaton Page
 An Interview with Dennis Heaton by Anthony Marco
 The Province - Motive’s Writers Have a Killer Job on CTV Series
 PlaybackOnline - In the Writers Room With Motive

Canadian male screenwriters
Canadian television writers
Living people
Year of birth missing (living people)
20th-century Canadian screenwriters
20th-century Canadian male writers
21st-century Canadian screenwriters
21st-century Canadian male writers